The Hawaiian people practiced aquaculture through development of fish ponds, the most advanced fish husbandry among the original peoples of the Pacific. While other cultures in places like Egypt and China also used the practice, Hawaii’s aquaculture was very advanced considering the much smaller size of the area compared to others before it. These fishponds were typically shallow areas of a reef flat surrounded by a low lava rock wall built out from the shore. Several species of edible fish (such as mullet) thrive in such ponds, and Hawaiians developed methods to make them easy to catch.

The Hawaiian fishpond was primarily a grazing area in which the fishpond keeper cultivated algae; much in the way a cattle rancher cultivates grass for his cattle. The porous lava walls let in seawater (or sometimes fresh or brackish water, as in the case of the "Menehune" fishpond near Līhue, Kauai), but prevent the fish from escaping. Fishponds were located next to the mouth of a stream, so by opening a sluice gate the pondkeeper provided the fish with water rich in nutrients that had passed through inland, terraced pondfields and returned to the stream. At the time of Captain James Cook's arrival, there were at least 360 fishponds producing  of fish per year.

Several fishponds have been restored in recent years. Although fishponds were developed on most islands, the largest number were found in Keehi Lagoon, Pearl Harbor, Maunalua Bay (known as the largest on Oahu prior to it being filled for housing development), and Kāneohe Bay on Oahu, and along nearly the entire south shore of Molokai. Few remain today, although Molokai offers the best opportunities to view a Hawaiian .

Three different styles of fish ponds are being reconstructed at the Kaloko-Honokōhau National Historical Park on the Big Island of Hawaii. The non-profit  is restoring Kalepolepo Fishpond also known as Koiei.e. in Kīhei on Maui using a mixture of volunteers and skilled stonemasons. On Oahu, the private non-profit organization Paepae o Heeia ("Threshold of Heʻeia") is rehabilitating the roughly 600-to–800-year-old Heeia Fishpond, which is a walled (kuapa-style) enclosure in Heʻeia covering  of brackish water.

Types of fishponds 
There were four basic types of fishponds developed within the Ahupua'a known in ancient Hawaii. The four types of fishponds were freshwater taro fishponds (loko i'a kalo), other freshwater ponds (loko wai), brackish water ponds (loko pu'unone), and seawater ponds (loko kuapa).

Taro fishponds (loko i'a kalo) were usually seen inland and were used to cultivated Taro as well as grow fish, such as mullet, silver perch, Hawaiian gobies, Freshwater prawn, and green algae. Taro fish ponds were usually located close to the sea and contained surplus of fish. Fish were also able to directly enter the taro patch-fishponds from the sea through newly created artificial estuary. Fish in these ponds thrived and were able to survive the transition from seawater to freshwater. They also helped the taro in these ponds by feeding on insects and ripe leaf stems of taro. The taro would help prevent silt by catching it before it would go downstream into the ocean. Planting between the wetland areas would also help provide such things as green manure and medicines.

Loko wai are other freshwater ponds that are seen inland and usually were excavated by hand from natural depressions like lakes or ponds and were supplied from naturally created water supplies (i.e., streams, rivers, springs, etc.). These ponds contained native species of freshwater prawn and fishes that migrate from the sea and into freshwater (i.e., mullet, milkfish. etc.). Fishes in these ponds were often harvested when spawning fish moved seaward, usually during full moons in the spring. 

Brackish water ponds (loko pu'unone) were seen very close to the ocean and excavated by hand from natural bodies of water that have been stranded by sea-level change, or by creating an earth embankment with mud, sand, and coral. This made a wall that separated the pond from the ocean. However, these ponds were still connected to the ocean via small canals which would allow seawater fished to enter the fishpond during the rising tide. These brackish-water ponds were very productive and was filled with many different types of species. 

According to B.A. Costa-Pierce, seawater ponds were the "ultimate aquaculture achievement of native Hawaiians and a valuable contribution to native engineering and subsistence food production." Coralline algae was gathered and used as a natural cement to hold and strengthen the walls. These ponds were very diverse, usually containing about 22 species of marine life. One of the most important features of these ponds were canals that was connected directly to the sea and had a grate made of wood and ferns that sat in the middle of these canals. These innovative grates allowed for very smaller fish to enter the pond and prevented bigger and mature fish from leaving. Harvesting were usually determined by the behavior of the fish. For example, during migration seasons for fishes such as milkfish and mullet that migrate to the ocean to spawn, keepers of the fishpond would set out nets on the pond side of the grates and watch as the fishes trap themselves as they try to reach the sea.

See also
 Clam garden
 Fish farming
 Heʻeia Fishpond
 Stew pond

Notes

References
 Farber, Joseph M (1997) Ancient Hawaiian fishponds: can restoration succeed on Molokaʻi? Cornell University. .
.
.
.

Aquaculture
Aquaculture
Hawaii
History of fishing
Agriculture in Hawaii